Karl Gustav Hansen (1914–2002) was a Danish master silversmith and designer. He is considered a pioneer of Scandinavian silversmith design, and was active during the Scandinavian modern-period.

Early life 
Karl Gustav Hansen was born 10 December 1914 in Kolding, Southern Denmark, Denmark. His father  (1884–1940) was a silversmith, specializing in holloware design, and later jewelry and had a silversmithy in the town of Kolding.

Education and career 
Starting in 1930, he apprenticed under his father at the Hans Hansen Sølvmedie (English: Hans Hansen Silversmithy) under Einar Olsen (1907–1988). During this time his father started a jewelry line, which Karl Gustav Hansen designed a "future"-themed jewelry series for in 1932. 

From 1935 to 1938, he studied under Einar Utzon-Frank at the Royal Danish Academy of Fine Arts in Copenhagen. After his father's death in 1940, Hansen returned to Kolding and took over the design leadership at the family silversmithy. Notable students of Hansens include Alma Eikerman, and Dwight Dillon.  

In 1982, he was awarded the Golden Ring of Honour by the Association for Goldsmiths’ Art.

Hansen's work can be found in museum collections including the Nationalmuseum, the Metropolitan Museum of Art, the Minneapolis Institute of Art, and the Rhode Island School of Design Museum.

See also 
 Household silver
 History of decorative arts

References 

1914 births
2002 deaths
Royal Danish Academy of Fine Arts alumni
People from Kolding
Danish silversmiths
Danish dinnerware designers
20th-century Danish sculptors